Tigrisoma is a genus of herons in the family Ardeidae.

The genus was erected by the English naturalist William Swainson in 1827, with the rufescent tiger heron (Tigrisoma lineatum) as the type species. The genus name combines the Ancient Greek tigris, meaning "tiger" and sôma, meaning "body".

Species
Three species are placed in the genus:

Beautiful in flight, great markings on the feathers. Nest that mostly resembles jumble pile of twigs with openings large enough to allow eggs to fall through. Calls sounds like sick cow. A contrast in elegance and coarseness.

References

 
Bird genera
Taxonomy articles created by Polbot